Wacol railway station is located on the Main line in Queensland, Australia. It serves the Brisbane suburb of Wacol. It is the last station on the Ipswich line located within Brisbane.

History 
The Wolston railway station was opened on 8 October 1874, taking its name from nearby Wolston House. However, the name caused confusion with the Wilston railway station, so it was renamed on 8 July 1927 to Wacol railway station. Wacol is a coined word from weigh coal, as the principal purpose of the station was coal handling.

In 1998, the timber station building was replaced. In 2011, bright murals depicting domestic wildlife, forests and farmlands were painted on the walls of platforms buildings. The animal theme was chosen because the RSPCA Animal Care Campus moved to Wacol in December 2011.

Services
Wacol is served by trains operating to and from Ipswich and Rosewood. Most city-bound services run to Caboolture and Nambour, with some morning peak trains terminating at Bowen Hills. Some afternoon inbound services on weekdays run to Kippa-Ring. Wacol is 25 minutes from Ipswich and 31 minutes on an all-stops train from Central.

Services by platform

*Note: One weekday morning service (4:56am from Central) and selected afternoon peak services continue through to Rosewood.  At all other times, a change of train is required at Ipswich.

References

External links

[ Wacol station] TransLink
Wacol station Queensland's Railways on the Internet

Railway stations in Brisbane
Wacol, Queensland
Main Line railway, Queensland